The 1954–55 SM-sarja season was the 24th season of the SM-sarja, the top level of ice hockey in Finland. 10 teams participated in the league, and Ilves Tampere won the championship.

Regular season

Group A

Group B

3rd place 
 HIFK Helsinki - TK-V Tampere 5:4/9:3

Finale
 TBK Tampere - TPS Turku 5:2/7:4

External links
 Season on hockeyarchives.info

Fin
Liiga seasons
1954–55 in Finnish ice hockey